Viktorovka is a village located in Chernihiv Raion, Chernihiv Oblast, Ukraine. It belongs to Ivanivka rural hromada, one of the hromadas of Ukraine. The population is 112 people.

KOATUU code: 7425588302. Postcode: 15564. Telephone code: +380 462.

Power 
Local Government - Slobodsky Village Council. Mailing address: 15564, Chernigov region, Chernigov district, p. Sloboda, st. Friendship, 76, tel. 68-82-42.

References

External links 

 Viktorovka on the site — foto-planeta.com

Pages with unreviewed translations

Villages in Chernihiv Raion